The Moerangi River or Moerangi Stream is found in New Zealand's Whirinaki Te Pua-a-Tāne Conservation Park.  It is a small river and is one of the main tributaries of the Waiau River, Hawke's Bay.  The river is used by trampers (hikers), fishermen, and hunters.

Access to Moerangi River is on foot or by helicopter. There are two main routes for reaching the river by walking. The track from Okahu Road through to Rogers Hut (6 Bunks) is moderate in difficulty and takes approximately 3 hours to walk. Another track begins at the Whirinaki Car Park at the end of River Road and leads to Moerangi hut (9 Bunks). This walk takes around 4 hours and crosses more difficult terrain than the Okahu Road option.

There is a tramping track that follows the river for most of its length.  The track runs from Rogers hut at the downstream end of the river up to Moerangi Hut in the upper part of the river.

The river has a good population of rainbow trout. It is an important spawning tributary for the Waiau River.  Trout in this river typically fall into the 3-6 pound bracket.  There is good fishing all the way from Rogers up to Moerangi Hut.  Past Moerangi hut the river decreases in size but in autumn the fish move into the headwaters to spawn.

The river and track that follows it provide good access to some fairly remote hunting grounds. Red deer are the most common game found in the area along with a few wild pigs.

References

Rivers of the Bay of Plenty Region
Rivers of New Zealand